Nines are an informal, logarithmic notation for proportions very near to one, or equivalently percentages very near 100%. Their common uses include grading the purity of materials.

Put simply, "nines" are the number of consecutive nines in a percentage such as 99% (two nines) or a decimal fraction such as 0.999 (three nines). The number of nines of a proportion  is

However, there are different conventions for stating a non-integer number of nines. 99.5% could be expressed as "two nines five" or 2.3 nines, as outlined below. A completely pure material ( = 1) would have an infinite number of nines.

Precious metals
The exact purity of very fine precious metals such as platinum, gold and silver can be of great interest. Based on the system of millesimal fineness, a metal is said to be one nine or one nine fine if it is 900 fine, or 90% pure. A metal that is 990 fine is then described as two nines fine and one that is 999 fine is described as three nines fine. Thus, nines are a logarithmic scale of purity for very fine precious metals. Similarly, percentages ending in a 5 have conventional names, traditionally the number of nines, then "five", so 999.5 fine (99.95% pure) is "three nines five", abbreviated 3N5.

Other Uses
The nines scale is also sometimes used in describing the purity of bottled gases. The purity of gas is an indication of the amount of other gases it contains. A high purity refers to a low amount of other gases. Gases of higher purity are considered to be of better quality and are usually more expensive.

The purity of a gas is generally expressed as a grade prefixed with the letter N giving the  "number of nines" in the percentage or decimal fraction.  For gasses, the number of nines is usually written after the letter N, rather than before it. An N2.0 gas is 99% pure, and 1% (by volume) impurities.  An N6.0 gas is 99.9999% (six nines) pure, with 1 part per million (1 ppm) impurities.

Intermediate values are formed using the common logarithm.  For example, a gas which is 99.97% pure would be described as N3.5, since log10(0.03%) = −3.523.

Nines are used in a similar manner to describe computer system availability.

References

See also
 List of unusual units of measurement
 Parts-per notation
 0.999...

Metallurgy
Gold investments
Precious metals
Units of purity
Jewellery making
Gases
Industrial gases